The Wigner semicircle distribution, named after the physicist Eugene Wigner, is the probability distribution on [−R, R] whose probability density function f is a scaled semicircle (i.e., a semi-ellipse) centered at (0, 0):

for −R ≤ x ≤ R, and f(x) = 0 if |x| > R.

It is also a scaled beta distribution: if Y is beta-distributed with parameters α = β = 3/2, then X = 2RY – R has the Wigner semicircle distribution.

The distribution arises as the limiting distribution of eigenvalues of many random symmetric matrices as the size of the matrix approaches infinity. The distribution of the spacing between eigenvalues is addressed by the similarly named Wigner surmise.

General properties 
The Chebyshev polynomials of the third kind are orthogonal polynomials with respect to the Wigner semicircle distribution.

For positive integers n, the 2n-th moment of this distribution is

where X is any random variable with this distribution and Cn is the nth Catalan number

so that the moments are the Catalan numbers if R = 2.  (Because of symmetry, all of the odd-order moments are zero.)

Making the substitution  into the defining equation for the moment generating function it can be seen that:

which can be solved (see Abramowitz and Stegun §9.6.18)
to yield:

where  is the modified Bessel function. Similarly, the characteristic function is given by:

where  is the Bessel function. (See Abramowitz and Stegun §9.1.20), noting that the corresponding integral involving  is zero.)

In the limit of  approaching zero, the Wigner semicircle distribution becomes a Dirac delta function.

Relation to free probability 
In free probability theory, the role of Wigner's semicircle distribution is analogous to that of the normal distribution in classical probability theory. Namely,
in free probability theory, the role of cumulants is occupied by "free cumulants", whose relation to ordinary cumulants is simply that the role of the set of all partitions of a finite set in the theory of ordinary cumulants is replaced by the set of all noncrossing partitions of a finite set.  Just as the cumulants of degree more than 2 of a probability distribution are all zero if and only if the distribution is normal, so also, the free cumulants of degree more than 2 of a probability distribution are all zero if and only if the distribution is Wigner's semicircle distribution.

Related distributions

Wigner (spherical) parabolic distribution 
The parabolic probability distribution  supported on the interval [−R, R] of radius R centered at (0, 0):

for −R ≤ x ≤ R, and f(x) = 0 if |x| > R.

Example. The joint distribution is

Hence, the marginal PDF of the spherical (parametric) distribution is:

 such that R=1

The characteristic function of a spherical distribution becomes the pattern multiplication of the expected values of the distributions in X, Y and Z.

The parabolic Wigner distribution is also considered the monopole moment of the hydrogen like atomic orbitals.

Wigner n-sphere distribution 
The normalized N-sphere probability density function supported on the interval [−1, 1] of radius 1 centered at (0, 0):

,

for −1 ≤ x ≤ 1, and f(x) = 0 if |x| > 1.

Example. The joint distribution is

Hence, the marginal PDF distribution is 

 such that R=1

The cumulative distribution function (CDF) is

 such that R=1 and n >= -1

The characteristic function (CF) of the PDF is related to the beta distribution as shown below

In terms of Bessel functions this is

Raw moments of the PDF are

Central moments are

The corresponding probability moments (mean, variance, skew, kurtosis and excess-kurtosis) are:

Raw moments of the characteristic function are:

For an even distribution the moments are 

Hence, the moments of the CF (provided N=1) are

Skew and Kurtosis can also be simplified in terms of Bessel functions.

The entropy is calculated as

The first 5 moments (n=-1 to 3), such that R=1 are

N-sphere Wigner distribution with odd symmetry applied 
The marginal PDF distribution with odd symmetry is 

 such that R=1

Hence, the CF is expressed in terms of Struve functions

"The Struve function arises in the problem of the rigid-piston radiator mounted in an infinite baffle, which has radiation impedance given by"

Example (Normalized Received Signal Strength): quadrature terms 
The normalized received signal strength is defined as

and using standard quadrature terms

Hence, for an even distribution we expand the NRSS, such that x = 1 and y = 0, obtaining

The expanded form of the Characteristic function of the received signal strength becomes

See also 
 Wigner surmise
 The Wigner semicircle distribution is the limit of the Kesten–McKay distributions, as the parameter d tends to infinity.
 In number-theoretic literature, the Wigner distribution is sometimes called the Sato–Tate distribution. See Sato–Tate conjecture.
 Marchenko–Pastur distribution or Free Poisson distribution

References 

 Milton Abramowitz and Irene A. Stegun, eds. Handbook of Mathematical Functions with Formulas, Graphs, and Mathematical Tables. New York: Dover, 1972.

External links 
 Eric W. Weisstein et al., Wigner's semicircle

Continuous distributions